Yelty, New South Wales is a civil parish of Manara County and a rural locality of Central Darling Shire in far western New South Wales.

Yelty is located at 32°55′48″S 144°11′55″E  and the area is hot and arid and as such there are no settlements with Matheson but the nearest town is Ivanhoe 3 kilometers to the south east.

References

Manara County